The Women's Javelin Throw event at the 2006 European Championships in Gothenburg, Sweden had a total number of 27 participating athletes. The final was held on Sunday August 13, 2006, and the qualifying round on Saturday August 12, 2006 with the mark set at 61.00 metres.

Medalists

Schedule
All times are Eastern European Time (UTC+2)

Abbreviations

Records

Qualification

Group A

Group B

Final

See also
 2004 Women's Olympic Javelin Throw (Athens)
 2005 Women's World Championships Javelin Throw (Helsinki)
 2007 Women's World Championships Javelin Throw (Osaka)
 2008 Women's Olympic Javelin Throw (Beijing)

References
 Official results
 todor66

Javelin throw
Javelin throw at the European Athletics Championships
2006 in women's athletics